The A Son de Guerra World Tour was a concert tour by Juan Luis Guerra, mainly to promote his eleventh studio album, A Son de Guerra (2010). The tour began with three shows in Puerto Rico before moving to South and Central America.

Supporting or co-headlining acts

Additional notes

(*) Denotes co-headlining act

Tour dates

 A The September 3, 2011 concert in Willemstad was part of the "Curazao North Seas Jazz Festival 2011".
 B The January 7, 2012 concert in Manizales at the Palogrande Stadium was part of the "Feria de Manizales 2012".

Cancellations and rescheduled shows

Box office data

See also
 A Son de Guerra Tour (album)

References

2011 concert tours
2012 concert tours
Juan Luis Guerra